The 1932 Kansas Jayhawks football team represented the University of Kansas in the Big Six Conference during the 1932 college football season. The team began the season with Bill Hargiss as head coach, but Hargiss resigned on October 10, and Adrian Lindsey took over as head coach for the third game of the season against Iowa State. The 1932 Jayhawks compiled a 5–3 record (3–2 against conference opponents), tied for second place in the conference, and outscored opponents by a combined total of 89 to 77. They played their home games at Memorial Stadium in Lawrence, Kansas.

Schedule

References

Kansas
Kansas Jayhawks football seasons
Kansas Jayhawks football